Glyptology is the study of engraved gems, or of engravings on gems.

See also
 Archaeology
 Gemology
 Mogul Mughal Emerald, a large emerald with much engraved text

References

Archaeological sub-disciplines
Gemology
Jewellery